Ramesh Behl was an Indian film director and producer belonging to Behl family of Hindi films. He produced known successful films like   The Train (1970 film), Kasme Vaade (1978). He directed films like Jawaani (1984), Pukar (1983) and Apne Apne (1987). He is the only filmmaker to have taken R. D. Burman as the music director for all his films. He died on 5 January 1990.

Personal life

His wife Madhu Behl was the daughter of actor Kamal Kapoor.

Behl's son Goldie Behl is also a director and producer. His daughter Srishti Arya (married to Sameer Arya - the son of Sulbha Arya and Ishan Arya) is a producer, media executive, co-founder of Rose Audiovisuals with her brother Goldie, former treasurer and the Vice President of the Producers Guild of India, former core member of Indian Film and TV Producers Council, and was the head of Netflix India till 2021. 

He is also father of 2 more daughters, Shraddha Behl and chef Tania R. Behl. Ramesh's sister  Shukla was married to Rajendra Kumar.

Filmography 
As Director:

See also
 List of Hindi film families

References

External links 
 

20th-century Indian film directors
Hindi-language film directors
Hindi film producers
1990 deaths
Year of birth missing
Place of birth missing